Jülide Sarıeroğlu (born 7 June 1979) is a Turkish labour economist, trade unionist, non-fiction writer and politician who served as the Minister of labour and social security from 19 July 2017 to 10 July 2018 in the Cabinet of Yıldırım.

Early life
Jülide Sarıeroğlu was born to Şadi and his wife Kadriye in Adana, Turkey on 7 June 1979. She studied labour economics at the Faculty of Economics and Administrative Sciences of Gazi University in Ankara and graduated with a Bachelor's degree from the Department of Labour Economics and Industrial Relations. Currently, she continues her studies at the same department for a Master's degree.

In politics
Sarıeroğlu joined the Justice and Development Party (AKP). She became a member of the Central Executive Committee's women's branch, and served as leader of some other committees in the party. She was alderman in the assembly of Çankaya municipality, chairperson of a trade union.

On 19 July 2017, she was appointed Minister of Labour and Social Security in the Second Cabinet of Binali Yıldırım. She is the second female government minister in the cabinet along with Fatma Betül Sayan Kaya, Minister of Family and Social Policy. Sarıeroğlu will be serving at this post as a woman 26 years after İmren Aykut  (in office 1987–1991).

She is the author of some practical books about working women rights, advantages of registered work, job search techniques, children's rights, and the examples of social dialogue in the EU countries.

Works
 Kadın Çalışmaları El Kitabı - Çalışan Kadınlar: Hakları ve Yeni Yasal Düzenlemeler
 Kayıtlı Çalışmanın Avantajları
 İş Arama Teknikleri
 Çocuk Hakları,
  AB Ülkelerinde Sosyal Diyalog Örnekleri

References

1979 births
Living people
People from Adana
Gazi University alumni
Turkish economists
Labor economists
Turkish trade unionists
Justice and Development Party (Turkey) politicians
Deputies of Ankara
Turkish women writers
Turkish non-fiction writers
Members of the 65th government of Turkey
Ministers of Labour and Social Security of Turkey
Women government ministers of Turkey
Government ministers of Turkey